Scale or scales may refer to:

Mathematics
 Scale (descriptive set theory), an object defined on a set of points
 Scale (ratio), the ratio of a linear dimension of a model to the corresponding dimension of the original
 Scale factor, a number which scales, or multiplies, some quantity
 Long and short scales, how powers of ten are named and grouped in large numbers
 Scale parameter, a description of the spread or dispersion of a probability distribution
 Feature scaling, a method used to normalize the range of independent variables or features of data
 Scale (analytical tool)

Measurements
 Scale (map), the ratio of the distance on a map to the corresponding actual distance
 Weighing scale, an instrument used to measure mass
 Scale (ratio), the ratio of the linear dimension of the model to the same dimension of the original
 Spatial scale, a classification of sizes
 Scale ruler,  a tool for measuring lengths and transferring measurements at a fixed ratio of length
 Vernier scale, the scale on calipers

Music
 Scale (music), a sequence of ordered musical notes
 Scale (string instruments), the sounding length of the strings of an instrument
 Scale (album), a 2006 album by electronic artist Matthew Herbert
 "The Scale", a song from Our Love to Admire by Interpol
 Musicians scale, the pay scale set by unions of musicians

Science

Biology
 Scale (anatomy), a rigid plate which grows out of the skin of various animals
 Scale (dermatology), a secondary skin lesion in humans that resembles animal scales
 Scale (insect anatomy), a feature of the wings of moths and butterflies
 Scale, a type of trichome, any flat epidermal outgrowth in botany
 Bulb scale, the storage layers of a plant bulb
 Scale insect, a waxy coated animal that resembles a fish scale

Chemistry and materials science
 Fouling, sometimes called , a buildup of unwanted substances on a submerged surface
 Limescale, a hard, chalky deposit that often builds up inside kettles, hot water boilers, and pipework
 Mill scale, the flaky surface on hot rolled steel, consisting of iron oxides
 Scale (chemistry), the range of mass or volume of a chemical reaction or process

Other sciences
 Scale (analytical tool), a concept in the study of complex systems and hierarchy theory
 Scale (social sciences), a tool for ordering entities by quantitative attributes

Places
 Scales, California, a community in the United States
 Scales, Lancashire, part of the village of Newton-with-Scales
 Scales, near Kirkoswald, Cumbria, a hamlet
 Scales, South Lakeland, Cumbria, England, a village
 The Scales, the initial climb of the Chilkoot Pass

Other uses
 Scales (surname)
 Scales (film), a 2019 Saudi Arabian film
 Baron Scales, a title in the Peerage of England
 Libra (constellation), also known as "the scales", or the namesake astrological sign
 Mizan (Scale in English), a treatise on Islam by Javed Ahmed Ghamidi
 Pay scale, a system or structure of compensation for work
 Scale armour, an early form of armor
 Southern California Linux Expo, an open-source software conference held in Los Angeles, California

See also
 Scala (disambiguation)
 Scalability, a concept in business, computer science, and electronics
 Scali (disambiguation)
 Scaling (disambiguation)